Hauptamt Sicherheitspolizei (Main Office of the Security Police) was a central state police agency command office in Nazi Germany entrusted with overseeing the Kriminalpolizei (Criminal Police; Kripo) and the Geheime Staatspolizei (Secret State Police; Gestapo) for the years 1936–1939.

Foundation
On 17 June 1936 all police forces throughout Germany were united, following Adolf Hitler's appointment of Heinrich Himmler as Chief of German Police. Himmler immediately reorganised the police into two groups: the Ordnungspolizei (Order Police; Orpo), consisting of both the national uniformed police and the municipal police, and the Sicherheitspolizei (Security Police; SiPo), consisting of the Kripo and Gestapo. Reinhard Heydrich was appointed chief of the SiPo and was already head of the party Sicherheitsdienst (Security Service; SD) and the Gestapo.

In 1936, the Hauptamt Sicherheitspolizei was founded by Himmler, in order to create a centralized command office under Nazi control of the German criminal investigation and secret state police organizations. Therefore, the central office of the national criminal police department, then known as the Reichskriminalpolizeiamt (RKPA), along with the central office of the Gestapo were integrated into the Hauptamt Sicherheitspolizei under Heydrich's overall command.

In September 1939, the Reichssicherheitshauptamt or Reich Security Main Office (RSHA) was created as the command organization for the various state investigation and security agencies. The Hauptamt Sicherheitspolizei was officially abolished and its departments were folded into the RSHA. The Gestapo became Amt IV (Department IV) and the Reichskriminalpolizeiamt became Amt V (Department V), the Kriminalpolizei in the RSHA.

Organization
Hauptamt Sicherheitspolizei was organized as a central office with three branches.
 Hauptbüro (central office): Reinhard Heydrich; deputy: Siegfried Taubert
 Amt Verwaltung und Recht (administration and law branch) with nine groups: Werner Best
 V.1 Law: Karl Zindel
 V.2 Finances: Rudolf Siegert
 V.3 Personnel I (Gestapo): Hans-Joachim Tesmer
 V.4 Personnel II (Kripo): Johannes Thiele
 V.5 Training: Johannes Thiele
 V.6 Passports and identification cards: Johannes Krause
 V.7 Interpol och border police: Dr Wetz
 V.8 Wehrmacht och national defense: Heinz Jost
 V.9 Technology: Walter Staudinger
 Amt Politische Polizei (political police branch) with two divisions and nine groups:
PP.IIA Communists and other marxists
PP.IIB Churches, sects, political refugees, Jews, and free masons
PP.IIC Reactionary opposition, Austria
PP.IID Protective custody, Nazi concentration camps 
PP.IIE Economy, social policy, associations
PP.IIG Broadcasting surveillance
PP.IIH Party matters
PP.IIJ Interpol
PP.IIP Press
PP.IIS Homosexuality, abortions
PP.III Counter espionage
 Amt Kriminalpolizei (criminal investigation branch) with three divisions:
 S-Kr.1: Johannes Krause
 S-Kr.2: Karl Zindel
 S-Kr.3: Johannes Thiele

Notes

References
 
 
 

Government of Nazi Germany
Police forces of Nazi Germany
Police of Nazi Germany
Reinhard Heydrich